The 2007-08 Austrian National League season was contested by nine teams, and saw EC-TREND Dornbirn win the championship. The top eight teams from the regular season qualified for the playoffs.

Regular season

Playoffs

External links
Season on hockeyarchives.info

Austrian National League
2007–08 in Austrian ice hockey leagues
Austrian National League seasons